Kensuke "Kenny" Iwabuchi (岩渕健輔 いわぶちけんすけ; born December 30, 1975, in Tokyo) is a Japanese rugby player and coach. He plays at stand off, and has 20 caps for the Japan national rugby union team. He also captained the Japan sevens team in the third sevens World Cup and was the first Japanese player to play professional rugby in England.

Player

Very quick and good at initiating backline moves, Iwabuchi's Achilles heel at the top level was his kicking ability, which he himself acknowledged was inferior to that of his excellent contemporary Keiji Hirose, who was a very reliable kicker, both of conversions and in open play.  (He was the backup to Hirose in the Rugby World Cup 1999.) Iwabuchi was also very unlucky with persistent serious injuries.

Career

Player

In 1998 he graduated from Aoyama Gakuin University in Tokyo, entered Kobe Steel and joined Kobelco Steelers. In October he proceeded to study overseas at Cambridge University where he won a Blue and much praise for his efforts in The Varsity Match.

In July 2000 he graduated from Cambridge and left Kobe Steel at the same time. In August he became the first Japanese player to join an English Premiership team when he signed up with Saracens in the Aviva Premiership.

In 2002 he suffered a severe knee injury playing sevens rugby at the Pusan Asian tournament.

Coach

In 2004 he was strategy controller at Fukuoka Sanix Blues, on secondment from Saracens. In 2005 he was registered at Sanix as a player-coach. The following year he moved to US Colomiers in France.

In 2007 he was registered as player-coach of Secom Rugguts. He also works part-time as a guest commentator for J Sports and did so for the Rugby World Cup 2007.

On February 28, 2008, he was announced as coach of the Japan national sevens team, working with Wataru Murata as head coach.

References

External links
 Japan's Iwabuchi signs for Saracens (Independent, August 10, 2000)

1975 births
Living people
Japanese rugby union coaches
Japanese rugby union players
Kobelco Kobe Steelers players
Aoyama Gakuin University alumni
Japan international rugby union players
Japanese expatriate rugby union players
Expatriate rugby union players in England
Japanese expatriate sportspeople in England
Asian Games medalists in rugby union
Rugby union players at the 2002 Asian Games
Asian Games silver medalists for Japan
Medalists at the 2002 Asian Games
Japan international rugby sevens players
Saracens F.C. players